Boy from New York City and Other Hits is a budget compilation album released by The Manhattan Transfer in 1997 on the Flashback Records label. This album was released  as part of a series of compilations of original artist recordings at a reduced price.

"The Boy from New York City" was sung by The Ad Libs in 1964 and also by Darts in 1978 before becoming a hit for the Manhattan Transfer in 1981.

Track listing
 "The Boy from New York City" (George Davis, John Taylor) (3:40)
 "Java Jive" (Ben Oakland, Milton Drake) (2:46)
 "Gloria" (Leon René) (2:58)
 "Helpless" (Lamont Dozier, Brian Holland, Eddie Holland) (3:07)
 "Tuxedo Junction" (Erskine Hawkins, William Johnson, Buddy Feyne, Julian Dash) (3:04)
 "Twilight Zone/Twilight Tone" (Bernard Herrmann, Jay Graydon, Alan Paul) (6:06)
 "Ray's Rockhouse" (Ray Charles, Jon Hendricks) (5:08)
 "Mystery" (Rod Temperton) (5:00)
 "Smile Again" (Bill Champlin, David Foster, Jay Graydon, Alan Paul) (4:33)
 "Birdland" (Joe Zawinul, Jon Hendricks) (6:01)

References

External links
 The Manhattan Transfer Official Website (requires Flash)

The Manhattan Transfer albums
1997 compilation albums